Robert "Bob" Carrigan (born January 28, 1966) is the CEO of Audible, Inc., having assumed the role on January 2, 2020. Previously, he was Chairman and Chief Executive Officer of Dun & Bradstreet between 2013 and 2018, and a senior executive at IDG Communications Inc. from 2003 to 2013.

Early life and education 
Carrigan graduated from Boston University with a bachelor's degree in Business Administration. He was raised in Philadelphia, PA.

Career 
 Chief Executive Officer, Audible, Jan. 2020 – present
Chairman and Chief Executive Officer, Dun & Bradstreet, Dec. 2016 – Feb 2018
 Chief Executive Officer and Director, Dun & Bradstreet, Nov. 2015 – Dec. 2016
 Chief Executive Officer, President and Director, Dun & Bradstreet, Oct. 2013 – Nov. 2015
 Chief Executive Officer, IDG Communications Inc., 2008 – 2013
 Multiple Senior Leadership roles, including President & Chief Executive Officer for US Business Units, IDG Communications, Inc., 2003 – 2008
 Senior Vice President, Interactive Media Group, AOL, Inc., 1999 – 2003
– Source:

Boards and honors 
Carrigan stepped down as chairman of the board of Dun & Bradstreet on February 12, 2018. He held a seat on the board of IDG from 2013 through 2017, until the company was sold to China Oceanwide. He served on the board of the Interactive Advertising Bureau (IAB) for seven years, and was Chairman in 2011. In 2016, Carrigan was named NJ Master Entrepreneur of the Year by Ernst & Young. In January 2017, Carrigan was appointed by President Obama to serve on the National Security Telecommunications Advisory Committee (NSTAC).

Personal life 
Carrigan is married with three children. In his free time, he plays the banjo.

References 

1966 births
Living people
American chief executives of financial services companies
Boston University School of Management alumni